Outlaw Country is a 1949 American Western film directed by Ray Taylor and starring Lash LaRue and Al "Fuzzy" St. John in a dual role as a U.S. Marshal and his outlaw brother known as the "Frontier Phantom".  The film, shot at the Iverson Movie Ranch led to a 1952 sequel The Frontier Phantom.

Plot
In a small area between the United States and Mexican frontier is a small area that is under the jurisdiction of neither nation.  Jim McCord charges outlaws on the run money to stay in his domain called "Robbers Roost".  McCord has also kidnapped a United States Treasury engraver and his daughter in order to create counterfeit US dollars. US Marshal Clark and his Mexican counterpart Señor Cordova recruit Marshal Lash La Rue and Deputy Fuzzy Q. Jones to "take the law into their own hands" to put the outlaws out of business.  One of the outlaws is Lash's twin brother, known as the Frontier Phantom.

Meanwhile, Fuzzy studies to become a hypnotist and a wizard.

Cast
Lash La Rue 	as Marshal Lash La Rue / The Frontier Phantom
Al St. John 	as Fuzzy Q. Jones
Dan White 	as Jim McCord
John Merton 	as Marshal Clark
Ted Adams 	as Frank Evans
Nancy Saunders 	as Jane Evans
Lee Roberts 	as Buck
 Bob Duncan 	as Deputy
 Sandy Sanders 	as Deputy
 Max Terhune Jr as Henchman
 Dee Cooper 	as Jeff
House Peters Jr. 	as Cal Saunders
 Jack O'Shea 	as Señor Cordova

References

External links

Outlaw Country at TCMDB

1949 films
American Western (genre) films
Films about hypnosis
1949 Western (genre) films
Lippert Pictures films
Films directed by Ray Taylor
American black-and-white films
1940s English-language films
1940s American films